This list includes commandants of the Turkish Coast Guard, who were, in their time of service, nominal heads of the Turkish Coast Guard.

The current Commandant of the Turkish Coast Guard is Rear Admiral Ahmet Kendir, since 12 August 2018.

See also 
List of Chiefs of the Turkish General Staff
List of Commanders of the Turkish Land Forces
List of Commanders of the Turkish Air Force
List of Commanders of the Turkish Naval Forces
List of General Commanders of the Turkish Gendarmerie

References 

Coast Guard